St. John's Episcopal Church is a historic Episcopal church located at Youngstown in Niagara County, New York.  It is a Gothic Revival style board and batten frame church constructed in 1878.

It was listed on the National Register of Historic Places in 1990.

References

External links

Churches on the National Register of Historic Places in New York (state)
Historic American Buildings Survey in New York (state)
Carpenter Gothic church buildings in New York (state)
Churches completed in 1878
19th-century Episcopal church buildings
Episcopal church buildings in New York (state)
Churches in Niagara County, New York
National Register of Historic Places in Niagara County, New York